The New Communist Party of the Netherlands (NCPN) is a communist party in the Netherlands. The NCPN was founded in 1992 by the former members of the Communist Party of the Netherlands to oppose CPN's merger into the left-wing GroenLinks. These members have been known as "the Horizontals". Through the Stichting HOC (Foundation HOC), the NCPN releases the monthly newspaper Manifest.

The NCPN actively supports the socialist government of Cuba. The party opposed the 2003 invasion of Iraq and is against Dutch military intervention through NATO or other military alliances. The party considers itself anti-capitalist, anti-fascist and anti-imperialist. It opposes both the active intervention of the EU and NATO in Ukraine but also the 2022 Russian invasion of Ukraine. It believes that a leninist view of anti-imperialism is not choosing sides in a inter-imperialist conflict. 

The NCPN works to preserve the heritage of the dutch communist movement through commemoration, like the February strike. It believes that increasing  anti-communist laws in Europe and the normalisation of far-right ideas is erasing that legacy.  The party also actively participates in the struggle against discrimination towards women and minorities with a migrant background, and is against homophobia and transphobia.

Though the party does not shun electoral politics, it places greater emphasis on working with mass movements and trade unions. It believes that victories for social conditions can only be achieved through social pressure, and will only participate in elections, local or national, when it is rooted in a popular base.

In 2003, the Communist Youth Movement (CJB) was founded as the NCPN's political youth organization. The CJB contributed to a revival of the party recently in term of membership and younger generations are gradually lowering the average age of a previously ageing membership.

History 
In 1982 a group of members of the Communist Party of the Netherlands founded the newspaper Manifest, out of discontent with the CPN leadership. In 1984 this group founded the League of Communists in the Netherlands (VCN). The CPN dissolved in 1992 in order to make place for a new political party, GreenLeft, an alliance in which the CPN had participated since the 1980s. Subsequently, the VCN, together with many former members of the CPN, founded the NCPN.

In 1999 the local branch of the NCPN in the municipality of Scheemda split from the party and continued as the United Communist Party (VCP), which has since won city council seats in Oldambt and Pekela.

Elections 
The NCPN has participated in elections to the Tweede Kamer, Provinciale Staten and gemeenteraden, but never in elections to the European Parliament. In the period between 1994 and 2002 the NCPN was part of the governing majority coalition in the municipality of Reiderland.

International activity 
The NCPN has participated in the annual International Communist Seminar and the annual International Meeting of Communist and Workers' Parties. The NCPN also often cooperates with fraternal parties like the Communist Party of Greece,  Communist Party of Turkey, Communist Party of Cuba,  Communist Party of Belgium, German Communist Party and the Communist Party of Luxembourg.

Notes

References

External links 
  
 Unofficial website of the local branch Twente
 Official website of the local branch Lemmer

International Meeting of Communist and Workers Parties
Communist parties in the Netherlands
Political parties established in 1992
1992 establishments in the Netherlands